Philtranco Service Enterprises, Inc. (Philippine Transportation Company) is a bus company in the Philippines, servicing routes to Bicol, Eastern Visayas, Caraga, Davao Region, and Northern Mindanao. It is the oldest bus operator in the Philippines and in Asia. It is also the only bus carrier with a nationwide public transport franchise. Philtranco currently has more than 250 buses for its operations.

History
Philtranco was established in 1914 when Mr. Albert Louis Ammen and Mr. Max Blouse organized the AL Ammen Transportation Company (ALATCO), operating passenger buses from Iriga to Naga.

In 1958, ownership was transferred to the Tuason family, and just before Martial Law, in 1971, to the Mantrade Group. It was then known as Pantranco South Express, Inc. (PSEI)

Creditors took over and re-engineered the company in 1974, enabling a financial turnaround despite the series of financial setbacks that hit the country in the eighties.

By 1979, the company expanded its coverage to the eastern Visayas region and went into ferry operations at the San Bernardino Strait three years after.

In 1984, the company formally changed its name to Philtranco Service Enterprises, Inc.

Two years later, in 1986, the LUZVIMINDA run was launched. This was the first archipelago-wide bus-cum-ferry operation which finally united the islands of Luzon, Visayas and Mindanao.

Soon after, both cargo truck and air-conditioned bus services followed with the company's Mindanao expansion.

In 1997, a group of young businessmen who had had success in running their own transport companies acquired a controlling interest. However, after just 2 years, the group accepted an offer by Penta Pacific Realty Corporation.

The company supported the Strong Republic Nautical Highway 2002 project of the government which opened opportunities for trade, commerce and tourism in the western Visayan corridor of the country.

In 2003, the Philtranco central station was built at the heart of Pasay. It features an automated passenger and baggage check-in system, fully air-conditioned pre-departure area, and a 24/7 staff committed to maintain the safety, orderliness and cleanliness of the station.

The company further opened the route from Manila to the Diosdado Macapagal International Airport in Clark, Pampanga in 2004; and subsequently, extended the connection to Subic.

It also constructed the Cubao common terminal in Quezon City in 2005.

Philtranco's terminal network functions not only as passenger stations but also provide repair, maintenance and refueling facilities for the fleet. There are currently thirty four (34) terminals and sub-stations.

Philtranco currently has 250 buses and provides transport services through Southern Tagalog, Bicol, Eastern Visayas, and the Mindanao regions.

Terminals 

 Cubao - Araneta City Bus Port, General Romulo Ave, Cubao, Quezon City
Pasay - EDSA corner, Apelo Cruz St, Pasay
Daet, Camarines Norte - 3 Gov Panotes Ave, Daet, Camarines Norte
Naga - Naga City Central Bus Terminal, Triangulo, Diversion Road, Naga City
Bocaue - North Luzon Express Terminal (NLET), Ciudad de Victoria, Bocaue, Bulacan
Iriga - San Nicolas Maharlika Highway, Iriga City
Legazpi - Legazpi Grand Central Terminal, Bitano, Legazpi City
Iloilo - Land height II, Brgy. Buntatala, Tagbak, Jaro, Iloilo City
Tacloban - Tacloban Bus Terminal, Brgy. Abucay, Tacloban City
Cagayan de Oro - Agora Bus Terminal, Brgy. Lapasan, Cagayan de Oro
Davao - Candelaria Street, Ecoland Bus Terminal, Davao City
Surigao - Lipata Port, Surigao City
Tandag - Tandag City Bus Teminal, Tandag City
Dau - Dau Terminal, Mabalacat City
Marikina - BFCT East Terminal, Marikina, 1800 Metro Manila

Destinations

Metro Manila 
 Araneta City Bus Port, Cubao, Quezon City
 EDSA, Pasay
 BFCT East Terminal, Marikina
 SM Mall of Asia Transportation Terminal, Pasay
 Parañaque Integrated Terminal Exchange, Parañaque

Provincial Destinations

 Clark International Airport, Clark Freeport Zone, Pampanga
 Dau Bus Terminal, Mabalacat, Pampanga
 NLET Terminal, Bocaue, Bulacan
 Olongapo, Zambales
 Subic, Zambales
 Santa Rosa Integrated Terminal, Santa Rosa, Laguna
 Turbina, Calamba, Laguna
 Batangas City, Batangas
Daet, Camarines Norte
Jose Panganiban, Camarines Norte
Goa, Camarines Sur
Buhi, Camarines Sur
Iriga, Camarines Sur
Naga City Central Bus Terminal, Naga, Camarines Sur
Legazpi Grand Central Terminal, Legazpi, Albay
Tabaco, Albay
Tiwi, Albay
Prieto Diaz, Sorsogon
Sorsogon City, Sorsogon
Donsol, Sorsogon
Caticlan, Malay, Aklan
Kalibo, Aklan
San Jose, Antique
Iloilo City, Iloilo
Naval, Biliran
Ormoc, Leyte
Tacloban New Transport Terminal, Tacloban, Leyte
Liloan, Southern Leyte
Bislig, Surigao del Sur
Tandag, Surigao del Sur
San Francisco, Agusan del Sur
 Agora Bus Terminal, Cagayan de Oro, Misamis Oriental
 Tagum Overland Transport Integrated Terminal, Tagum, Davao del Norte
 Davao City Overland Transport Terminal, Davao City, Davao del Sur

Subsidiaries 
Current Philtranco's subsidiaries:
 Amihan Bus Lines Inc.
 Philtourister Inc.

External links
Philtranco Website
Philtranco Official Facebook Page

References

Bus companies of the Philippines
Transportation in Mindanao
Companies based in Camarines Sur
1914 establishments in the Philippines